Samuel Kyle may refer to:

 Sam Kyle (1884–1962), Irish trade unionist and politician
 Samuel Kyle (bishop) (died 1848), Bishop of Cork and Ross, and of Cork, Cloyne and Ross